The 18th Emmy Awards, later known as the 18th Primetime Emmy Awards, were handed out on May 22, 1966, at the Hollywood Palladium.  The ceremony was hosted by Danny Kaye and Bill Cosby.

The top show of the night was The Dick Van Dyke Show, which won its fourth consecutive top series award, and tied the record (since broken) of five major wins. The ceremony returned to a more traditional format, after experimenting the previous year.

Winners and nominees
Winners are listed in bold and series' networks are in parentheses.

Programs

Acting

Lead performances

Supporting performances

Single performances

Directing

Writing

Most major nominations
By network 
 NBC – 45
 CBS – 29
 ABC – 15

 By program
 Hallmark Hall of Fame (NBC) – 11
 The Dick Van Dyke Show (CBS) – 8
 I Spy (NBC) – 7
 Bob Hope Presents the Chrysler Theatre (NBC) – 6
 Bewitched (ABC) – 5
 Get Smart (NBC) – 4

Most major awards
By network 
 NBC – 45
 CBS – 9
 ABC – 5

 By program
 The Dick Van Dyke Show (CBS)  – 4
 Bob Hope Presents the Chrysler Theatre (NBC) – 4
 Bewitched (ABC) – 2
 Hallmark Hall of Fame (NBC) – 2

Notes

References

External links
 Emmys.com list of 1966 Nominees & Winners
 

018
Primetime Emmy Awards
Primetime Emmy Awards
Primetime Emmy
Primetime Emmy Awards